Chili con carne (also spelled chilli con carne or chile con carne and shortened to chili or chilli), meaning "chili with meat", is a spicy stew containing chili peppers (sometimes in the form of chili powder), meat (usually beef), tomatoes, and often pinto beans or kidney beans. Other seasonings may include garlic, onions, and cumin. The dish originated in northern Mexico or southern Texas.

Geographic and personal tastes involve different types of meat and other ingredients. Recipes provoke disputes among aficionados, some of whom insist that the word chili applies only to the basic dish, without beans and tomatoes. Chili con carne is a common dish for cook-offs, and may be used as a side, garnish, or ingredient in other dishes, such as soups or salsas.

Origins and history
In writings from 1529, the Franciscan friar Bernardino de Sahagún described chili pepper-seasoned stews being consumed in the Aztec capital, Tenochtitlan, now the location of Mexico City. The use of beef as the primary meat originated with Spanish colonizers. In Spanish, the term "chile con carne", consisting of the word chile (from the Nahuatl chīlli) and carne, Spanish for 'meat', is first recorded in a book from 1857 about the Mexican–American War. A recipe dating back to the 1850s describes dried beef, suet, dried chili peppers and salt, which were pounded together, formed into bricks and left to dry, which could then be boiled in pots in an army encampment in Monterrey, of what is now Nuevo León, Mexico.

Chili became commonly prepared in northern Mexico and southern Texas. Unlike some other Texas foods, such as barbecued brisket, chili largely originated with working-class Tejana and Mexican women. The chili queens of San Antonio, Texas were particularly famous in previous decades for selling their inexpensive chili-flavored beef stew in their casual "chili joints".

The San Antonio Chili Stand, in operation at the 1893 Columbian Exposition in Chicago, helped popularize chili by giving many Americans their first taste of it. San Antonio was a tourist destination and helped Texas-style chili con carne spread throughout the South and West. Chili con carne is the official dish of the U.S. state of Texas as designated by the House Concurrent Resolution Number 18 of the 65th Texas Legislature during its regular session in 1977.

Chili parlors

Before World War II, hundreds of small, family-run chili parlors could be found throughout Texas and other states, particularly those in which émigré Texans had made new homes. Each establishment usually had a claim to some kind of secret recipe.

By 1904, chili parlors were opening outside of Texas, in part due to the availability of commercial versions of chili powder, first manufactured in Texas in the late 19th century. After working at the Louisiana Purchase Exposition, Charles Taylor opened a chili parlor in Carlinville, Illinois, serving Mexican Chili. Varallo's, the oldest restaurant in Tennessee, opened as a chili parlor in 1907, competing with other chili parlors that had opened in Nashville during the 1890s. In the 1920s and 1930s, chains of diner-style chili parlors began opening in the Midwest.

Cincinnati chili is a dish developed by Macedonian and Greek immigrants, deriving from their own culinary traditions. Dozens of restaurants offer this style throughout the Cincinnati area. It can be traced back to at least 1922, when the original Empress Chili location opened.

In Green Bay, Wisconsin, the chili parlor Chili John's has existed since 1913. As with Cincinnati chili, it is most commonly served over spaghetti with oyster crackers, but the recipe has more chili powder and a higher proportion of fat. The original proprietor's son opened a second location in Burbank, California in 1946, which is also still in existence.

Until the late 2000s, a chili parlor dating to 1904, O.T. Hodge, continued to operate in St. Louis. It featured a chili-topped dish called a slinger: two cheeseburger patties, hash browns, and two eggs, and smothered in chili. As of 2014 no O.T. Hodge-branded locations remain, though Tully's Tap, a pub and restaurant in O'Fallon, Missouri, offers what it claims to be the original O.T. Hodge recipe on its menu.

Dispute over ingredients

Beans
Beans, a staple of Tex-Mex cuisine, have been associated with chili as far back as the early 20th century. The question of whether beans belong in chili has long been a matter of contention among chili cooks. While it is generally accepted that the earliest chilis did not include beans, proponents of their inclusion contend that chili with beans has a long enough history to be considered authentic. The Chili Appreciation Society International specified in 1999 that, among other things, cooks are forbidden to include beans in the preparation of chili for official competition—nor are they allowed to marinate any meats. Small red or pink common beans are commonly used for chili, as are black beans, black-eyed peas, kidney beans, pinto beans, great northern beans, or navy beans.

Most commercially prepared canned chili includes beans. Commercial chili prepared without beans is usually called "chili no beans" in the United States. Some U.S. manufacturers, notably Bush Brothers and Company and Eden Organic, also sell canned precooked beans (without meat) that are labeled "chili beans"; these beans are intended for consumers to add to a chili recipe and are often sold with spices added.

Tomatoes
Tomatoes are another ingredient on which opinions differ. Wick Fowler, a north Texas newspaperman and inventor of "Two-Alarm Chili" (which he later marketed as a kit of spices), insisted on adding tomato sauce to his chili in the ratio of one 15-ounce can per three pounds of meat (425 g per 1.36 kg). He also believed that chili should never be eaten freshly cooked, but refrigerated overnight to seal in the flavor. Matt Weinstock, a Los Angeles newspaper columnist, once remarked that Fowler's chili "was reputed to open eighteen sinus cavities unknown to the medical profession".

Variations

Vegetarian chili

Vegetarian chili (also known as chili sin carne, chili without meat, chili non carne, and chili sans carne) acquired wide popularity in the U.S. during the 1960s and 1970s with the rise of vegetarianism. It is also popular with those on a diet restricting the use of red meat. To make the chili vegetarian, the cook leaves out the meat or replaces it with a meat analogue, such as textured vegetable protein or tofu, quinoa, or a starchy vegetable, such as potatoes. These chilis nearly always include beans. Variants may contain corn, squash, sautéed mushrooms, pearl onions, shallots or beets.

Chile verde
Chile verde ('green chile') is a moderately to extremely spicy New Mexican stew or sauce usually made from chunks of pork that have been slow-cooked in chicken broth, garlic, green tomatillos, and roasted green chile. The spiciness of the chile is adjusted by the use of various peppers: Hatch chile, poblano, jalapeño, serrano, and occasionally habanero. Chile verde is a common filling for the Mission burrito.

White chili

White chili is made using chicken or turkey meat and broth, white beans, and green chili peppers. The resulting dish appears white when cooked. A white cheese, such as Monterey Jack, or sour cream are often added when served.

Accompaniments and additions

The dish may be served with toppings or accompaniments; grated cheese, diced onions, and sour cream are common toppings, as are saltine crackers, tortilla chips or corn chips, cornbread, rolled-up corn or flour tortillas, and pork tamales. Chili can also be served over rice or pasta in dishes such as chili mac.

Pre-made chili

Canned chili
 

Willie Gebhardt, originally of New Braunfels, Texas, and later of San Antonio, produced the first canned chili in 1908. Rancher Lyman Davis near Corsicana, Texas, developed Wolf Brand Chili in 1895. He owned a meat market and was a particular fan of Texas-style chili. In the 1880s, in partnership with an experienced range cook, he began producing heavily spiced chili based on chunks of lean beef and rendered beef suet, which he sold by the pot to local cafés.

In 1921, Davis began canning his product, naming it for his pet wolf, Kaiser Bill. Wolf Brand canned chili was a favorite of Will Rogers, who always took along a case when traveling and performing in other regions of the world. Ernest Tubb, the country singer, was such a fan that one Texas hotel maintained a supply of Wolf Brand for his visits. Both the Gebhardt and Wolf brands are now owned by ConAgra Foods, Inc. Another major maker of canned chili, Hormel, sells chili available with or without beans, made with turkey or in vegetarian varieties, under their own name and other brands like Stagg.

Brick chili
Another method of marketing commercial chili in the days before widespread home refrigerators was "brick chili". It was produced by pressing out nearly all of the moisture, leaving a solid substance roughly the size and shape of a half-brick. Wolf Brand was originally sold in this form. Commonly available in small towns and rural areas of the American Southwest in the first three-quarters of the 20th century, brick chili has largely been superseded by canned chili. A few manufacturers, such as XLNT Foods and Dolores Canning in Southern California, continue to distribute brick chili to supermarkets.

Seasoning mix
Home cooks may also purchase seasoning mixes for chili, including packets of dry ingredients such as chili powder, masa flour, salt, and cayenne pepper, to flavor meat and other ingredients.

Other dishes made with chili
 A chili dog is a hot dog served with a topping of chili (usually without beans).
 A chili burger is a burger topped with chili (usually without beans). 
 Chili is also added to french fries and cheese to make chili cheese fries, or Coney Island fries.
 Chili mac is a dish made with canned chili, or roughly the same ingredients as chili (meat, spices, onion, tomato sauce, beans, and sometimes other vegetables), with the addition of macaroni or some other pasta. Chili mac is a standard dish in the U.S. military and is one of the varieties of Meal, Ready-to-Eat (MRE).
 A Frito pie or walking taco, as it is called at festivals and county fairs in the midwest, typically consists of a small, single-serving bag of Fritos corn chips with a cup of chili poured over them, often topped with grated cheese or onions and jalapeños and sour cream. Frito pies are popular in the southwestern United States.

See also

Notes

References

 Charles Ramsdell. San Antonio: An Historical and Pictorial Guide. Austin: University of Texas Press, 1959.
 Joe E. Cooper. With or Without Beans. Dallas: W. S. Henson, 1952.
 H. Allen Smith. "Nobody Knows More About Chili Than I Do." Reprinted at the  web site. 
 Jack Arnold. The Chili Lover's Handbook. Privately published, 1977.
 Robb Walsh. The Tex-Mex Cookbook: A History in Recipes and Photos. New York: Broadway Books, 2004. [A very knowledgeable and very well-written "food history", including a long chapter on "real" chili, chili joints, and the San Antonio chili queens.]
 Fr. Michael Muller. The Catholic Dogma, 1888
 Frank X. Tolbert. A Bowl of Red: A Natural History of Chili con Carne. Garden City, N.Y.: Doubleday, 1966. [Much of the material in this book originally appeared in the author's newspaper columns in The Dallas Morning News beginning in the early 1950s.]

External links

 Chili Appreciation Society International
 International Chili Society

 
American cuisine
Meat stews
Tex-Mex cuisine
Cuisine of the Southwestern United States
Cuisine of the Southern United States
Mexican cuisine
Symbols of Texas